The 2003 Army Black Knights football team was an American football team that represented the United States Military Academy as a member of Conference USA (C-USA) in the 2003 NCAA Division I-A football season. The Black Knights compiled a 0–13 record and were outscored by their opponents by a combined total of 476 to 206. They were the first major college football program to finish 0-13. In the annual Army–Navy Game, the Black Knights lost to Navy, 34–6. Todd Berry began the year in his fourth season as the team's head coach.  Berry coached the first six games, but was replaced by John Mumford who served as interim head coach for the final seven games.

Schedule

Roster

References

Army
Army Black Knights football seasons
College football winless seasons
Army Cadets football